Park Sang-ki (Korean: 박상기, born 1952) is South Korean educator, jurist, prosecutor and politician who served as the Minister of Justice under Moon Jae-in Cabinet from May 2017 to September 2019.

Born in Muan, Park attended for University of Göttingen. He used to be a both lecturer and professor at Yonsei University. He is also a member of Citizens' Coalition for Economic Justice (CCEJ) and used to be one of its Co-Presidents from February to June 2017. He was also the ex-Director of Dongduk Women's University from 2004 to 2007.

Park formerly worked at Supreme Prosecutors' Office from 1998 to 2005, and also at Ministry of Justice from 2004 to 2011. He seeks to reform prosecution.

On 27 June 2017, Park was designated as Minister of Justice, after the resignation of Ahn Kyung-hwan. He was officially appointed on 19 July and assumed for the office. During this time, he faced several controversies, including receiving the treat, bitcoin crisis, and suppression of trade union. He was replaced by Cho Kuk on 9 September 2019.

His son is a lawyer.

References 

1952 births
Living people
Justice ministers of South Korea
Yonsei University alumni
University of Würzburg alumni
University of Göttingen alumni
Academic staff of Yonsei University
South Korean legal scholars
21st-century South Korean politicians
People from South Jeolla Province